Salvadori's antwren (Myrmotherula minor) is a species of bird in the family Thamnophilidae. It is endemic to the eastern ridge of the Atlantic Forest, where it is threatened by habitat loss.

Its name is in honour of Italian zoologist and ornithologist Tommaso Salvadori.

References

External links

BirdLife Species Factsheet.

Myrmotherula
Birds of the Atlantic Forest
Endemic birds of Brazil
Birds described in 1864
Taxonomy articles created by Polbot